Saturday of Souls (or Soul Saturday) is a day set aside for the commemoration of the dead within the liturgical year of the Eastern Orthodox and Eastern Catholic Churches. Saturday is a traditional day of prayer for the dead, because Christ lay dead in the Tomb on Saturday.

These days are devoted to prayer for departed relatives and others among the faithful who would not be commemorated specifically as saints. The Divine Services on these days have special hymns added to them to commemorate the departed. There is often a Panikhida (Memorial Service) either after the Divine Liturgy on Saturday morning or after Vespers on Friday evening, for which Koliva (a dish made of boiled wheatberries or rice and honey) is prepared and placed on the Panikhida table. After the Service, the priest blesses the Koliva. It is then eaten as a memorial by all present.

Relationship to Radonitsa 
Another Memorial Day, Radonitsa, does not fall on a Saturday, but on either Monday or Tuesday of the second week after Pascha (Easter). Radonitsa does not have special hymns for the dead at the Divine Services. Instead, a Panikhida will follow the Divine Liturgy, and then, all will bring paschal foods to the cemeteries to greet the departed with the joy of the Resurrection.

Schedule
There are several Soul Saturdays throughout the year:
 The Saturday of Meatfare Week (the second Saturday before Great Lent)
 The second Saturday of Great Lent
 The third Saturday of Great Lent
 The fourth Saturday of Great Lent
 Radonitsa (Monday or Tuesday after St. Thomas Sunday, i.e. Second Sunday of Easter)
 The Saturday before Pentecost
Intercession Saturday (the Saturday before the Intercession Day, i.e. 1 October).
 Demetrius Saturday (the Saturday before the feast of Saint Demetrius of Thessaloniki, i.e. 26 October).

Observances by jurisdiction

Orthodox and Byzantine Catholics
All Orthodox and Byzantine Catholics observe Soul Saturdays on Meatfare Saturday (i.e., two Saturdays before the beginning of Great Lent); the second, third and fourth Saturdays of Great Lent; and the Saturday before Pentecost.

Bulgarian Orthodox Church
In the Bulgarian Orthodox Church, there is a commemoration of the dead on the Saturday before the feast of Saint Michael the Archangel on 8 November instead of the Demetrius Soul Saturday.

Russian Orthodox Church
The Russians observe memorials on Commemoration Day of Deceased Warriors (9 May), Memorial Day of Orthodox Warriors killed for Faith, Tzar and Fatherland on battlefield (11 September), the Saturdays closest to 26 October (Saint Demetrius) and 23 September (Conception of St. John the Forerunner).

Serbian Orthodox Church
In the Serbian Orthodox Church, there is also a commemoration of the dead on the Saturday closest to the Conception of St. John the Baptist—23 September.

Slavic and Greek Churches
In Slavic and Greek Churches, all of the Lenten Soul Saturdays are typically observed. In some of the Churches of the Eastern Mediterranean, Meatfare Saturday, Radonitsa and the Saturday before Pentecost are typically observed.

See also
 Prayer for the dead
 Panikhida
 Koliva
 All Souls Day
 Radonitsa
 Thursday of the Dead
 Totensonntag

References

External links
Photo: Ektenia during Panikhida
Photo: Blessing Kolyva at the end of a Panikhida

Death customs
Eastern Orthodox liturgical days
Christianity and death
Holidays based on the date of Easter
Christian festivals and holy days
March observances
April observances
October observances
Saturday observances
Observances honoring the dead